Cerchez, Cherchez and Cerkez are Romanian words meaning "Circassian". The Circassians were a prominent minority in Northern Dobruja during the 19th century. This region now belongs to Romania.

Cerchez, and its variations, may refer to:

 Cerchez (surname), a Romanian surname
 Cerchez (river), a Romanian river
 Cerchezu (formerly known as Cerchezchioi), a commune in Constanța County named after the Circassians
 Slava Cercheză, a commune in Tulcea County named after the Circassians
 Cerchez, the Romanian name of Cherkesy, a Ukrainian village in the Odessa Oblast
 Cerchez & Co., the first Romanian aircraft company, aerodrome and flight school, named after its founder Mihail Cerchez

See also
 Circassian (disambiguation)
 Circassians in Romania